Jorge Carlos Ramírez Marín (born August 14, 1961) is a Mexican politician from the Institutional Revolutionary Party (PRI), who since September 2018, serves as a Senator to the LXIV Legislature of the Mexican Congress for the state of Yucatán. He also has served as the Secretary of Agricultural, Territorial and Urban Development of Mexico and as Deputy of the LXIII and LXI Legislatures, representing his home state of Yucatán and the third electoral region.

Education 
Jorge Carlos Ramirez Marin graduated in 1985 with a law degree from the Autonomous University of Yucatán (UADY). He also has a degree in Industrial Relations from the Monterrey Institute of Technology and Higher Education (ITESM) and in Parliamentary Law from the Change Foundation.

Bio 
Ramírez Marín was born on August 14, 1961 in Mérida and was raised in the Santa Ana neighborhood. In 1979, he joined the PRI; in 1982, he began a 27-year career as the Director of Industrial Relations of Industria Salinera de Yucatán, S.A. de C.V.

His first experience as a legislator came in 1993, when he began the first of two terms in the state legislature of Yucatán and served as the president of the Finance Commission. After his term ended, Ramírez Marín was tapped to head the PRI in Yucatán between 1996 and 1999; he was also the Chief Clerk of the Yucatán state government between 1998 and 2001. After making a failed bid in 1994, Ramírez Marín finally won a seat in the federal Chamber of Deputies in 2000. In the LVIII Legislature, he was the PRI's vice coordinator and sat on the Jurisdictional and Communications Commissions, as well as the Oversight Commission for the Superior Auditor of the Federation.

In 2004, Ramírez Marín served another term, this time three years, in the state legislature of Yucatán. After he left, he became the president of the PRI's Institute of Training and Political Development. He left that post to become a federal deputy once more, this time in the LXI Legislature. He was the president of the Board of Directors, the highest post in the legislature, and he sat on seven commissions: Jurisdictional, Finances and Public Credit, Constitutional Points, Rules and Parliamentary Practices, Science and Technology, Special on Expenses, and Oversight Commission for the Superior Auditor of the Federation. He also concurrently served as a representative of the government of Yucatán in Mexico City.

In 2012, after being a coordinator in the PRI presidential campaign and serving on President-elect Enrique Peña Nieto's transition team, Peña Nieto invited Ramírez Marín to join his cabinet as the first Secretary of Agricultural, Territorial and Urban Development (SEDATU).  The aforementioned secretariat was created in the midst of a severe crisis in the housing industry; under Ramírez Marín, housing companies returned to financial stability within just two years. He left SEDATU on February 27, 2015, in order to pursue a candidacy as a PRI proportional representation deputy from the third region.

He is currently the vice coordinator of the PRI parliamentary groups in the House of Representatives, a position that alternates with his duties as Representative of the PRI before the General Council of the National Electoral Institute (INE).

References

1961 births
Living people
Politicians from Yucatán (state)
People from Mérida, Yucatán
Members of the Chamber of Deputies (Mexico) for Yucatán
Presidents of the Chamber of Deputies (Mexico)
Institutional Revolutionary Party politicians
20th-century Mexican politicians
21st-century Mexican politicians
Universidad Autónoma de Yucatán alumni
Members of the Congress of Yucatán
Deputies of the LXI Legislature of Mexico
Deputies of the LXIII Legislature of Mexico